The year 620 BC was a year of the pre-Julian Roman calendar. In the Roman Empire, it was known as year 134 Ab urbe condita . The denomination 620 BC for this year has been used since the early medieval period, when the Anno Domini calendar era became the prevalent method in Europe for naming years.

Events
 The Etruscans took over Rome.

Births
 Aesop, Greek fable writer (approximate date)
 Alcaeus of Mytilene, Greek lyric poet from Lesbos Island
 Chilon of Sparta, one of the Seven Sages of Greece (approximate date)
 Sappho, Greek lyric poet from Lesbos Island (approximate date)

Deaths

References